Gerasimovo is a rural locality (a village) in Nesterovskoye Rural Settlement, Sokolsky District, Vologda Oblast, Russia. The population was 13 as of 2002.

Geography 
Gerasimovo is located 43 km north of Sokol (the district's administrative centre) by road. Bessolovo is the nearest rural locality.

References 

Rural localities in Sokolsky District, Vologda Oblast